Christopher M. "Chris" Tjornhom (March 18, 1959 – May 29, 2012) was an American businessman, activist, and politician who served as a member of the Minnesota House of Representatives.

Early life and education 
Tjornhom was born and raised in Richfield, Minnesota. Tjornhom studied business administration and social science at Northwestern College.

Career 
Prior to entering politics, Tjornhom worked as a painting contractor in Richfield, Minnesota. He served in the Minnesota House of Representatives from district 40A from 1985 to 1990 as a Republican. Tjornhom was also a member of the Independent-Republican Party. After leaving the House of Representatives, Tjornhom served as chair of the Carver County Republican Party.

Personal life 
Tjornhom and his wife, Bethany, had three children. He died in his sleep at his home in Chanhassen, Minnesota.

Notes

1959 births
2012 deaths
People from Richfield, Minnesota
Businesspeople from Minnesota
Republican Party members of the Minnesota House of Representatives
20th-century American businesspeople